Healing a man with dropsy is one of the miracles of Jesus in the Gospels (Luke 14:1-6).

According to the Gospel, one Sabbath, Jesus went to eat in the house of a prominent Pharisee, and he was being carefully watched. There in front of him was a man suffering from dropsy, i.e. abnormal swelling of his body.

Jesus asked the Pharisees and experts in the law:

"Is it lawful to heal on the Sabbath or not?"

But they remained silent. So taking hold of the man, he healed him and sent him on his way.

Then he asked them:

"If one of you has a child or an ox that falls into a well on the Sabbath day, will you not immediately pull it out?"

And they had nothing to say.

Commentary
Cornelius a Lapide comments on the mystical significance of the animals, writing, "that the ox and the donkey represent the wise and the foolish," which are "the Jew oppressed by the burden of the Law" (the ox) and "the Gentile not subject to reason." (the donkey/child) In both cases the Lord rescues them from the pit of concupiscence.

Commenting on the offended, speechless Pharisee, Theophylact of Ohrid writes, “Care nought, for the offence given to the Pharisees.” For when a great good is the result, we should not care if the foolish are offended.

See also

 Life of Jesus in the New Testament
 Ministry of Jesus
 Miracles of Jesus
 Parables of Jesus
 Pikuach nefesh

References

Miracles of Jesus
Supernatural healing